Choekor Gewog is a gewog (village block) of Bumthang District, Bhutan.

See also
Kurjey

References

Gewogs of Bhutan
Bumthang District